Iton Meyuhad (lit. Special newspaper) was a weekly magazine published in Israel in 1933-1952.

History
Iton Meyuhad was published and the edited by Alexander Sauber. It mainly dealt with business and crime, and was considered the first newspaper in Israel that dealt with unsubstantiated rumors and gossip. It is also known for being the first newspaper in Israel that used color.

Most of the newspaper was written by Sauber himself, under different names. The titles were often strange and sensationalist. Other writers for the paper included Yitzhak Sadeh (as Y. Noded), Malchiel Gruenwald and David Almog.

In 1952, Sauber was invited to write for Yedioth Ahronoth, took the job, and stopped publishing Iton Meyuhad.

References

Defunct magazines published in Israel
Hebrew-language journals
Magazines established in 1933
Magazines disestablished in 1952
News magazines published in Israel
Religious magazines
Religious Zionism
Weekly news magazines